Allen José Yanes Pinto (born July 4, 1997) is a Guatemalan professional footballer who plays as a defender for Liga Nacional club Comunicaciones.

Career

Antigua
In 2015, Yanes signed his first professional contract with Antigua GFC in Liga Nacional de Fútbol de Guatemala. During his first two years with Antigua, he won two league titles in the 2015–16 and 2016–17 seasons. On 18 October 2016, Yanes made his CONCACAF Champions League debut in a 3–1 defeat against Alianza. Yanes scored his first goal in a 3–2 loss against C.D. Suchitepéquez on 19 April 2018. He ended the season with his third consecutive league title.

New York Red Bulls II
On July 11, 2018 it was announced that Yanes had signed with New York Red Bulls II in the United States.
 On July 28 he made his debut for the club, coming on as a second-half substitute in a 2-2 draw with Tampa Bay Rowdies.

Comunicaciones
On 24 December 2019 it was confirmed, that Yanes had returned to Guatemala, joining Comunicaciones.

International
Despite being born in the United States, Yanes has represented Guatemala at the U17 and U20 levels. He received his first call up to the senior team in June 2013 for a friendly match against Argentina.

Career statistics

Honours
Antigua
Liga Nacional de Guatemala: Apertura 2015, Apertura 2016, Apertura 2017, Clausura 2022
Comunicaciones 
CONCACAF League: 2021

References

External links
 

1997 births
Living people
2015 CONCACAF U-20 Championship players
American people of Guatemalan descent
American sportspeople of North American descent
Sportspeople of Guatemalan descent
Antigua GFC players
Association football defenders
Comunicaciones F.C. players
Guatemala international footballers
Guatemala under-20 international footballers
Guatemala youth international footballers
Guatemalan footballers
Liga Nacional de Fútbol de Guatemala players
New York Red Bulls II players
People with acquired Guatemalan citizenship
Soccer players from Los Angeles
Sportspeople from Orange County, California
USL Championship players